Marcelo Russo Guerreiro Correia (born 25 March 1993 in Faro) is a Portuguese footballer who plays for S.C. Farense as a defender.

Football career
On 27 July 2014, Correia made his professional debut with Farense in a 2014–15 Taça da Liga match against Chaves.

References

External links

Stats and profile at LPFP 

1993 births
Living people
Portuguese footballers
Association football defenders
S.C. Farense players
People from Faro, Portugal
Sportspeople from Faro District